Cristina María Torres Malinow (born 3 October 2000) is a Puerto Rican footballer who plays as a winger for Mazatlán and the Puerto Rico national team.

Club career

Bayamon FC 
On 23 July 2016, Torres made her full debut for the Bayamon first team in the Liga PR against Metropolitan FC, scoring her first goal just 22 minutes into the match.

Puerto Rico Sol
In June 2018, she joined Liga PR side Puerto Rico Sol. She made 31 starts for the club, scoring 19 goals.

EC Bastia
In October 2020, Torres joined EC Bastia on three-month loan.

Detroit City FC
In May 2021, Torres joined Detroit City FC on three-month loan.

Mazatlán F.C.
Torres signed with Liga MX Femenil club Mazatlán in December 2022.

International career 

Torres made her senior Puerto Rico debut in August 2018, in a 0–3 friendly loss to Argentina in Mayaguez. On September 3, 2018, Torres scored a goal as Puerto Rico tied Argentina 1-1. 
On June 14, 2019, Torres scored a goal in 2–1 loss to Bolivia.

Honors
2018/19 Liga PR Champion 
2019/20 Liga PR Champion

References

2000 births
Living people
Puerto Rican women's footballers
Women's association football midfielders
Puerto Rico women's international footballers
Puerto Rican expatriate women's footballers
Puerto Rican expatriate sportspeople in France
Expatriate women's footballers in France
Puerto Rican expatriate sportspeople in Mexico
Expatriate women's footballers in Mexico